Montanidion is a monotypic genus of Malaysian comb-footed spiders containing the single species, Montanidion kuantanense. It was first described by J. Wunderlich in 2011, and is found in Malaysia. The structure of the male pedipalp indicates that it may be related to members of Tamanidion.

See also
 List of Theridiidae species

References

Monotypic Araneomorphae genera
Spiders of Asia
Theridiidae